Don Cowan (born 16 November 1989) is a former professional footballer who played as a winger or forward.

Cowan started his career with Shamrock Rovers, playing for the club's 'A' team before making a number of substitute appearances for the first-team over two seasons. He joined Longford Town on loan to gain first-team experience, and the move was made permanent ahead of the 2011 season. After playing regularly at Longford, Cowan signed for League One club Stevenage for an undisclosed fee in August 2011. Cowan joined Braintree Town on a one-month loan deal in November 2012, which was curtailed due to injury. He left Stevenage by mutual consent in January 2013.

Cowan signed one-month contracts at Dundee and Southend United later that year, as well as returning to Stevenage on a one-month agreement in September 2013. Cowan then returned to Longford in January 2014, helping the club achieve promotion to the League of Ireland Premier Division during the 2014 season. He spent four seasons at Longford before retiring from football in 2017.

Early life
Cowan was born in New York City. His footballing hero when growing up was Andy Cole.

Career

Early career
Cowan began his career with Shamrock Rovers A, playing in the 2009 A Championship. He progressed to the first-team, making his Shamrock Rovers debut as an 87th-minute substitute in a 2–1 win over St Patrick's Athletic in the League of Ireland Premier Division on 4 July 2009. He made four further appearances during the 2009 season, all of which were from the substitute's bench in the second-half. Cowan made his first appearance of the 2010 campaign in Rovers' 2–0 home defeat to Dundalk, as a 59th-minute substitute.

Longford Town
He made three substitute appearances for Shamrock Rovers during the early stages of the season, before joining First Division club Longford Town on 19 July 2010, in order to play regular first-team football. He made his debut for Longford in the club's 1–1 home draw with Cork City on 3 July 2010, starting a first-team match for the first time in his career. Cowan made 13 appearances for Longford during the season, eight of which were starting appearances, without scoring.

Ahead of the 2011 season, Cowan signed for Longford Town on a permanent basis. He scored his first goal in Longford's first game of the season, scoring in the fourth minute of the match in an eventual 2–1 defeat to Shelbourne on 5 March 2011. Throughout April 2011, Cowan scored in home victories against Waterford United and Salthill Devon respectively, taking his goal tally to four for the season. He went on trial with English Championship club Millwall in July 2011, after he had impressed the Millwall management team in a friendly between the two clubs. He played for Millwall reserve team in a match against Brighton & Hove Albion reserves, although no transfer materialised. Cowan returned to Longford, scoring his last goal for the club in a home defeat to Shelbourne on 13 August 2011, having scored his first professional goal against the same team five months earlier. Cowan played 33 times for Longford in all competitions, scoring eight goals.

Stevenage
Following a trial with the club, Cowan signed for League One club Stevenage on 31 August 2011, joining for an undisclosed fee. Cowan missed Stevenage's 4–2 victory over Rochdale on 3 September 2011 due to a delay in confirming his international clearance. International clearance was granted for Cowan on 13 September 2011 and his undisclosed five-figure fee transfer was completed. A number of "niggling injuries" prevented him from making any first-team appearances for Stevenage during his first two months with the club, ultimately making his first-team debut on 17 December 2011, coming on as a 77th-minute substitute in a 2–1 home victory against Tranmere Rovers. Cowan made his first start in Stevenage's next match, playing 57 minutes in a 6–1 away victory at Colchester United on 26 December 2011. He scored four of Stevenage's five goals in the club's 5–0 Herts Senior Cup victory over Barnet on 31 January 2012, all of which were scored in the first half of the match. In the following round of the Herts Senior Cup, an away match against Bishop's Stortford, Cowan was substituted after a "rather innocuous tackle" caused swelling to his right ankle. The following day, an X-ray displayed a transverse fracture at the base of the tibia, and Cowan was ruled out of first-team action for six months, subsequently missing the remainder of the 2011–12 season, as well as the start of the following campaign.

Having made no first-team appearances since recovering from his six-month injury, Cowan was loaned out to Conference Premier club Braintree Town on 22 November 2012, on a one-month loan agreement. Eight minutes into his Braintree debut, in an away match against Southport on 8 December 2012, he was substituted due to injury. Cowan returned to Stevenage prematurely, and in January 2013, left the club by mutual consent. He made nine appearances for the club in all competitions, with his time at Stevenage hampered by a number of injuries.

Dundee
Cowan signed for Scottish Premier League club Dundee on a free transfer on 19 February 2013. A month after signing for the club, Cowan made his debut in Dundee's 1–1 draw away to rivals Dundee United, coming on as an 80th-minute substitute. Cowan's first-team opportunities were limited under new manager John Brown, and he was released by the club following Dundee's relegation having made two substitute appearances during his time there.

Southend United
He returned to England to sign for League Two club Southend United on a one-month contract on 5 August 2013. He made his debut in Southend's 1–0 home defeat to Yeovil Town in the League Cup on 6 August 2013, playing the first 71 minutes of the match. Cowan made two further appearances during his month-long agreement, before leaving Southend upon the expiry of his contract on 2 September 2013.

Return to Stevenage
Without a club for a month, Cowan rejoined League One club Stevenage on 27 September 2013, joining on a one-month contract. A day later, he played as a second-half substitute in Stevenage's 4–1 away defeat to Milton Keynes Dons. After making two appearances on his return to Stevenage, Cowan left the club after his one-month contract concluded on 21 October 2013.

Longford Town
He re-joined Longford Town on 10 January 2014. Cowan made his first appearance upon his return to Longford during the club's opening game of the 2014 season, in a 1–0 victory against Galway on 7 March 2014. He scored his first goal of the season, Longford's sixth of the match, in the club's 6–0 victory against Shamrock Rovers B on 30 May 2014. Cowan scored three goals in 24 appearances in all competitions as Longford won the League of Ireland First Division title that season after finishing in first place.

He was limited to 10 appearances in Longford's first season back Premier Division during the 2015 season, scoring his only goal of the season in a 2–1 victory away at Galway United on 27 March 2015. Cowan played 21 times during Longford's 2016 campaign as they were relegated back to the First Division. He remained at the club for the 2017 season, playing 23 times. Cowan retired from playing football in October 2017.

Career statistics

A.  The "League" column constitutes appearances and goals (including those as a substitute) in League of Ireland.
B.  The "Other" column constitutes appearances and goals (including those as a substitute) in the FAI Cup.

Honours
Longford Town
League of Ireland First Division: 2014

References

External links

1989 births
Living people
American expatriates in Ireland
Soccer players from New York City
Republic of Ireland association footballers
Association football forwards
Shamrock Rovers F.C. players
Longford Town F.C. players
Stevenage F.C. players
Braintree Town F.C. players
Dundee F.C. players
Southend United F.C. players
English Football League players
National League (English football) players
League of Ireland players
Scottish Premier League players
A Championship players